Events from the year 1926 in the United Kingdom. The year was dominated by the general strike.

Incumbents
 Monarch – George V
 Prime Minister – Stanley Baldwin (Conservative)
 Parliament – 34th

Events
 1 January – Law of Property Act 1925 and Administration of Estates Act 1925 come into effect modernising the laws on real estate and intestacy.
 2 January – contributory old age pensions payable to those between 65 and 70 years of age under the provisions of the Widows', Orphans', and Old-Age Contributory Pensions Act of 1925.
 16 January – a British Broadcasting Company radio play by Ronald Knox about workers' revolution in London causes a panic among those who have not heard the preliminary announcement that it is a satire on broadcasting.
 26 January – Scottish inventor John Logie Baird demonstrates his pioneering mechanical television system (which he calls a "televisor") at his London laboratory for members of the Royal Institution and a reporter from The Times.
 31 January – British and Belgian troops leave Cologne.
 9 February – flooding of London suburbs.
 c. February – K2 red telephone box introduced, chiefly in London area.
 6 March – the Shakespeare Memorial Theatre in Stratford-upon-Avon is destroyed by fire.
 17 March – University of Reading chartered, the only institution to be newly granted full university status in the U.K. in the interwar period.
 1 May – coal miners' strike begins in Britain over planned pay reductions.
 3 May – general strike begins in support of the miners' strike at midnight 3–4 May.
 4 May – the BBC broadcasts five news bulletins a day as no newspapers are published due to the general strike.
 9 May – martial law in Britain because of the general strike.
 10 May – talks between government and strikers begin.
 12 May – the general strike ends at midnight 12–13 May without concessions to the strikers; coal miners remain on strike.
 24 July – first greyhound racing track in Britain opens in Manchester.
 6 August – American swimmer Gertrude Ederle becomes the first woman to swim the English Channel, from France to England.
 7 August – the first British Grand Prix held at the Brooklands circuit near Weybridge.
 18 August – the Miners' Federation of Great Britain begins negotiations with the government.
 30 August – cricketer Jack Hobbs scores 316 runs at match at Lord's, the highest individual total scored at that ground.
 29 November – coal miners agree to end their national dispute and return to work. A majority of the Miners Federation have voted to continue the strike but with less than the required two-thirds majority.
 December – Imperial Chemical Industries formed by merger of Brunner Mond, Nobel Explosives, the United Alkali Company, and the British Dyestuffs Corporation.
 2 December – the Prime Minister Stanley Baldwin ends the martial law that had been declared due to the general strike.
 3 December – Agatha Christie disappears from her home in Surrey; on 14 December she is found in a Harrogate hotel (under her husband's mistress's surname) by journalist Ritchie Calder.
 7 December – the Council for the Preservation of Rural England, later the Campaign to Protect Rural England (CPRE), is founded by Patrick Abercrombie to limit urban sprawl and ribbon development.
 15 December
 Legitimacy Act 1926 permits the legitimisation of a child born to unmarried parents by their subsequent marriage to each other.
 Electricity (Supply) Act creates the Central Electricity Board to set up the National Grid.
 31 December – Hadow report on The Education of the Adolescent published.

Undated
 New Ways, a house for Wenman Joseph Bassett-Lowke in Northampton, is designed by German architect Peter Behrens; it is "a pioneer of modern architecture in Britain".
 First appearance of the Gill Sans sans-serif typeface, designed by Eric Gill for Douglas Cleverdon.

Publications
 Patrick Abercrombie's tract The Preservation of Rural England.
 Agatha Christie's Hercule Poirot novel The Murder of Roger Ackroyd.
 Georgette Heyer's historical romance novel These Old Shades.
 D. H. Lawrence's novel The Plumed Serpent.
 Hugh MacDiarmid's Scots language poem A Drunk Man Looks at the Thistle.
 A. A. Milne's children's book Winnie-the-Pooh.

Births

 

 1 January – Laurie Clough, cricketer (died 2008)
 3 January – George Martin, producer of The Beatles (died 2016)
 4 January – Don Arden, music manager (died 2007)
 5 January – Robin Leigh-Pemberton, Baron Kingsdown, peer, banker (died 2013)
 13 January
 Craigie Aitchison, painter (died 2009)
 Michael Bond, author and creator of Paddington Bear (died 2017)
 14 January – Warren Mitchell, actor (died 2015)
 17 January – Moira Shearer, actress and dancer (died 2006)
 19 January – Bob Wooler, disc jockey (died 2002)
 20 January – Sarah Conlon, campaigner (died 2008)
 26 January 
 Ronnie Hilton, singer and radio presenter (died 2001)
 Charles Henderson Tidbury, brewing executive (died 2003)
 10 February
 Danny Blanchflower, footballer and football manager (died 1993)
 Hazel Court, actress (died 2008)
 11 February – Alexander Gibson, conductor and founder of Scottish Opera (died 1995)
 12 February – Paul Hamlyn, publisher and philanthropist (born in Germany; died 2001)
 16 February
 David C. H. Austin, rose breeder (died 2018)
 John Schlesinger, film director (died 2003)
 20 February – Gillian Lynne, choreographer (died 2018)
 22 February – Kenneth Williams, actor (died 1988)
 24 February – Reg Freeson, politician (died 2006)
 1 March 
 Barbara Clegg, actress and scriptwriter
 Bryan Jennett, neurosurgeon (died 2008)
 2 March – George P. L. Walker, geologist (died 2005)
 5 March – Norman Macfarlane, Baron Macfarlane of Bearsden, Scottish industrialist and politician (died 2021)
 6 March – Ken Whyld, chess player and chess writer (died 2003)
 8 March – Edith MacArthur, actress (died 2018)
 11 March
 Derek Benfield, actor (died 2009)
 Dennis Wilshaw, footballer (died 2004)
 14 March – Lita Roza, singer (died 2008)
 19 March – Tony Collins, English football player and manager (died 2021)  
 24 March – Tony Streather, army officer (died 2018)
 26 March – Frank Newby, structural engineer (died 2001)
 27 March – Louis Blom-Cooper, lawyer (died 2018)
 31 March – John Fowles, novelist (died 2005)
 1 April – William Macpherson, Scottish High Court judge (died 2021)
 2 April – Robert Holmes, scriptwriter (died 1986)
 3 April – Timothy Bateson, actor (died 2009)
 6 April – Ian Paisley, politician (died 2014)
 8 April – David Neil MacKenzie, linguist (died 2001)
 9 April – Gerry Fitt, politician (died 2005)
 11 April – Gervase de Peyer, clarinetist (died 2017)
 13 April – John Spencer-Churchill, 11th Duke of Marlborough, aristocrat (died 2014)
 17 April – Gordon Rollings, actor (died 1985)
 20 April – Cy Laurie, clarinetist (died 2002)
 21 April
 Arthur Rowley, footballer (died 2002)
 Queen Elizabeth II (died 2022)
 22 April – James Stirling, architect (died 1992)
 24 April – Lady Elizabeth Cavendish, aristocrat and courtier (died 2018)
 26 April – David Coleman, television sports broadcaster (died 2013)
 29 April – Leonard Fenton, actor and director (died 2022)
 30 April – Edmund Cooper, author and poet (died 1982)
 3 May – Eric Sams, musicologist and Shakespeare scholar (died 2004)
 4 May – David Stoddart, Baron Stoddart of Swindon, politician (died 2020)
 5 May – Maurice Taylor, Scottish Roman Catholic bishop
 8 May – David Attenborough, broadcaster and naturalist
 12 May – John Shipley Rowlinson, chemist and academic (died 2018)
 14 May – Eric Morecambe, comedian (died 1984)
 15 May – Anthony Shaffer (died 2001) and Peter Shaffer (died 2016), playwrights
 17 May
 Cicely Berry, voice coach (died 2018)
 Tenniel Evans, actor (died 2009)
 David Ogilvy, 13th Earl of Airlie, Scottish soldier, politician 
 19 May – Edward Parkes, engineer and academic (died 2019)
 22 May – John Morrison, 2nd Viscount Dunrossil, peer and diplomat (died 2000)
 23 May – Desmond Carrington, actor and broadcaster (died 2017)
 24 May – Stanley Baxter, Scottish actor and screenwriter 
 28? May – Colin Hutton, rugby union, rugby league player (died 2017)
 29 May – Katie Boyle, Italian-British actress, television personality, and game-show panelist (died 2018)  
 1 June – Johnny Berry, footballer (died 1994)
 8 June 
 Meredith Belbin, researcher and management consultant 
 Cranley Onslow, politician (died 2001)
 David Williams, crime writer (died 2003)
 11 June – John Aspinall, zoo owner (died 2000)
 17 June – Alan Walters, economist (died 2009)
 20 June – Ernest Arthur Bell, biochemist (died 2006)
 23 June – Lawson Soulsby, parasitologist (died 2017)
 25 June – Dame Margaret Anstee, diplomat (died 2016)
 26 June 
Sir Rex Hunt, diplomat (died 2012)
 Reg Newton, professional football goalkeeper (died 1976)
 29 June – Denys Graham, Welsh actor
 4 July – Willoughby Goddard, actor (died 2008)
 5 July – Anthony Purssell, brewing executive, businessman and former athlete
 7 July – Bobby McIlvenny, Northern Irish footballer (died 2016)
 8 July – Ian Gilmour, Conservative politician (died 2007)
 12 July – Cec Thompson, rugby league footballer (died 2011)
 18 July 
 Elizabeth Jennings, poet (died 2001)
 Robert Sloman, actor and journalist (died 2005)
 21 July 
 Bill Pertwee, actor (died 2013)
 Karel Reisz, Czech-born film director (died 2002)
 22 July – Bryan Forbes, film director (died 2013)
 27 July – Nina Lawson, wig-maker (died 2008)
 30 July – Thomas Patrick Russell, High Court judge (died 2002)
 1 August – Hannah Hauxwell, farmer and TV personality (died 2018)
 3 August – Anthony Sampson, journalist and biographer (died 2004)
 9 August – Willie Finlay, Scottish professional football player and coach (d. 2014)
 11 August – Bernard Ashley, businessman (died 2009)
 13 August – Dennis Eagan, field hockey player (died 2012)
 16 August – Christopher Polge, biologist (died 2006)
 17 August – George Melly, jazz singer (died 2007)
 19 August
 George Daniels, horologist (died 2011)
 Martin Halliday, physician (died 2008)
 27 August – Pat Coombs, actress (died 2002)
 4 September – George William Gray, Scottish-born chemist, pioneer of liquid crystal technology (died 2013)
 6 September 
 Maurice Cowling, historian (died 2005)
 Arthur Oldham, composer and choirmaster (died 2003)
 7 September – Patrick Jenkin, Conservative politician (died 2016)
 12 September – Dave Valentine, Scottish representative rugby union and rugby league footballer (died 1976)
 17 September – Reginald Marsh, actor (died 2001)
 18 September – Thomas Hetherington, barrister (died 2007)
 24 September – Aubrey Burl, archaeologist (died 2020)
 25 September – Stafford Beer, theorist and author (died 2002)
 2 October – Jan Morris, born James Morris, travel writer (died 2020)
 9 October – Ruth Ellis, nightclub hostess, last woman hanged in the UK (died 1955)
 20 October – Austen Kark, television executive (died 2002)
 21 October – Leonard Rossiter, actor (died 1984)
 23 October – Janet Young, Baroness Young, politician (died 2002)
 31 October – Jimmy Savile, disc jockey, broadcast presenter, philanthropist and serial sex offender (died 2011)
 5 November – John Berger, art critic, novelist and painter (died 2017)
 6 November – Frank Carson, comedian (died 2012) 
 8 November – John Louis Mansi, actor (died 2010)
 11 November – Harold Perkin, social historian (died 2004)
 12 November – Robert Goff, Baron Goff of Chieveley, lawyer and judge (died 2016)
 20 November – John Gardner, writer (died 2007)
 25 November 
Terry Hall, ventriloquist (died 2007)
Terry Kilburn, actor
Peter Wright, ballet director and choreographer 
 28 November – David Alexander, Royal Marines general (died 2017)
 17 December – John Poole, sculptor (died 2009)
 20 December – Geoffrey Howe, politician (died 2015)
 22 December – Roberta Leigh, writer, artist and television producer (died 2014)
 25 December – Barry Driscoll, painter and sculptor (died 2006)

Deaths

 6 January – John Bowers, Anglican suffragan Bishop of Thetford (born 1854)
 28 January – Sir Ernest Troubridge, admiral (born 1862)
 1 February – William Heap Bailey, Scottish footballer (born 1847)
 7 February – William Evans Hoyle, director of the National Museum of Wales (born 1855)
 8 February – William Bateson, geneticist (born 1861)
 13 February – Francis Ysidro Edgeworth, Anglo-Irish political economist (born 1845)
 3 March – Sir Sidney Lee, biographer (born 1859)
 29 March – Charles Crook, teacher, trade unionist and politician (born 1862)
 4 April – Thomas Burberry, businessman and inventor (born 1835)
 9 May – J. M. Dent, publisher (born 1849)
 21 May – Ronald Firbank, novelist (born 1886)
 24 May – Sir Thomas Erskine Holland, academic lawyer (born 1835)
 8 June – Emily Hobhouse, welfare campaigner (born 1860) 
 2 July – Laurence George Bomford, artist (born 1847)
 12 July – Gertrude Bell, archaeologist, writer, spy, and administrator known as the "Uncrowned Queen of Iraq" (born 1868)
 1 August – Israel Zangwill, novelist, poet and playwright (born 1864)
 25 September – Herbert Booth, Salvationist, third son of William and Catherine Booth (born 1862)
 28 September – Helen Allingham, watercolour painter and illustrator (born 1848)
 5 October – Dorothy Tennant (Lady Stanley), artist (born 1855)
 12 October – Edwin Abbott Abbott, schoolmaster and theologian (born 1838)
 13 October – Eliseus Williams ("Eifion Wyn"), poet (born 1867)
 4 November – John Owen, Bishop of St David's (born 1854)
 15 November – Marjory Newbold, political activist (born 1883)
 4 December – Ferdinand Begg, Scottish stockbroker and politician (born 1847)
 8 December – Sarah Doudney, novelist, children's writer and hymnist (born 1841)

See also
 List of British films of 1926

References

 
Years of the 20th century in the United Kingdom